Daniel Azro Ashley Buck (April 19, 1789December 24, 1841) was an American lawyer and politician in the U.S. state of Vermont. He served as a U.S. Representative from Vermont and as Speaker of the Vermont House of Representatives.

Early life
Buck was born in Norwich in the Vermont Republic, the son of U. S. Representative Daniel Buck and Content (Ashley) Buck. As a child he moved with his parents to Chelsea. He attended the common schools and graduated from Middlebury College in 1807 with classmates William Slade and Stephen Royce. He graduated first in his class from the United States Military Academy in 1808, and was commissioned a lieutenant in the Engineer Corps of the United States Army. For the next 3 years, he served as an engineer in the construction of Fort Wood on Bedloe's Island. He resigned his commission in August 1811 and began the study of law.

In October 1812 he was appointed a second lieutenant in the 3rd Artillery, which he declined. He instead raised a volunteer company of rangers, and was appointed a captain of the 31st Infantry in April 1813. He was honorably discharged on June 15, 1815. Following his discharge, he was admitted to the bar, and began the practice of law in Chelsea. He received the honorary degree of Master of Arts from Dartmouth College in 1823.

Political career
Buck held various political positions in Vermont, and was elected a member of the State house of representatives in 1816. He served in the State House three times, from 1816-1826, 1828-1830 and 1833-1835. He was Speaker of the House from 1820-1822, 1825-1826 and in 1829.

He was State's Attorney for Orange County from 1819-1822 and 1830-1834. He was a presidential elector in 1820. He was elected as an Adams-Clay Republican candidate to the Eighteenth Congress, serving from March 4, 1823, to March 3, 1825. He was then elected to the Twentieth Congress, serving from March 4, 1827, to March 3, 1829. He was an unsuccessful candidate for renomination in 1828. He was a trustee of the University of Vermont and Norwich University.

After leaving Congress he moved to Washington, D.C., and served as a clerk in the War Department from 1835-1839. He then served as a clerk in the Treasury Department in 1840.

Buck died in Washington, D.C. on December 24, 1841, and is interred in the Congressional Cemetery in Washington D.C.

Family life
Buck married Philometa C. Dodge on November 10, 1816. Their children were Daniel Buck, Elizabeth Morse Buck, Ben Buck and Londus Buck.

References

External links 

	

1789 births
People from Chelsea, Vermont
People from Norwich, Vermont
United States Military Academy alumni
Middlebury College alumni
Vermont lawyers
United States Army personnel of the War of 1812
Members of the Vermont House of Representatives
Speakers of the Vermont House of Representatives
Burials at the Congressional Cemetery
1841 deaths
Dartmouth College alumni
Democratic-Republican Party members of the United States House of Representatives from Vermont
19th-century American politicians
State's attorneys in Vermont
United States Army officers
19th-century American lawyers